Tony Adam Mochama (born 9 May 1975) is a Kenyan poet, writer, author and a senior journalist at The Nation Media Group. Mochama is a three-time winner of the Burt Awards for African Young Adult Literature and he is also a recipient of Miles Morland Writing Scholarship.

Education 
Mochama attended Catholic Primary School and graduated in 1993 from the Starehe Boys’ Centre founded by the late Geoffrey Griffin who spotted his creative talent. He studied Law at the University of Nairobi from 1997 until 2001 before shifting his focus to creative writing and journalism. He attended Herzen University Summer Literary Seminars to hone his creative writing between 2003 and 2006.

Career 
In the early 2003, Mochama began to work for ‘eXpression Today,’ a bi-weekly newspaper dedicated mostly to the issues of press freedom. He was also a freelance correspondent for The Nation Newspapers handling human interest features as well as theatre and book reviews. In the same year, he moved to Standard Media Group (SMG) where he became a senior writer and ran four weekly columns. At the beginning of 2022, Mochama was taken by the Nation Media Group, the largest media conglomerate in the East African region. He has published up to ten books including A Jacket for Ahmet (2017) and 2063 – Last Mile Bet, Afro-futuristic (2018).

Mochama is the Secretary General of PEN (Kenya), an association of writers and subsidiary of PEN International. He was a Kenyan delegate at the 82nd PEN Congress, Ourense Spain in 2016. He attended the summer program scholarship under the Summer Literary Seminars (SLS) to study creative writing at the Herzen University, Saint Petersburg, Russia in classes run by creative writers such as George Saunders. Mochama would attend three more SLS seminars between 2004 and 2006, to perfect his craft in both prose and poetry.

Mochama was a 2013 resident poet at the Ca’Foscari University, Venezia, Italy and a 2019 Emily Harvey Foundation resident writer in Venice, Italy. He has also visited Canada, London, Portugal and (Germany) under different literary activities as a speaker, reader and facilitator.

Court case 
In 2014, Mochama was accused of sexually assaulting the Asian-Kenyan poet and feminist activist Shailja Patel. Prof. Wambui Mwangi led the public uproar, which permeated Twitter for days, following the accusation. Later, the Nairobi CID overturned the case by officially concluding it, as both malicious and an afterthought. Mochama then sued Shailja Patel and Prof. Wambui Mwangi for four million Kenyan shillings in punitive damage to his reputation, under the Civil Suit number 399 of 2015.  It was announced on the 6th of August 2019 that a Kenyan court absolved and awarded Mochama 9 million shillings for defamation.  The court has also ordered both Shalja Patel and Prof Wambui Mwangi to apologise to Mochama through the court within 14 days.

Literary Work 
2018 – 2063 – Last Mile Bet, Afro-futuristic long novel: Oxford University Press
2017 – A Jacket for Ahmet, Burt Award-winning YA novella: East African Educational Publishers
2016 – Run, Cheche, Run,, Burt Award-winning YA novella: East African Educational Publishers
2015 – Modern Poetry for Secondary Schools, poetry text book:Phoenix Publishers
2014 – Nairobi – A Night Guide through the City in the Sun, nocturnal essays: Contact Zones
2013 – Meet the Omtitas, Burt Award-winning YA novella: Phoenix Publishers
2012 – Percy's Killer Party, a play in the Goethe-Institute-commissioned ‘Six and the City’ series
2011 – Princess Adhis and the Naija Coca Brodas, crime noir, Storymoja Publishers
2009 – The Road to Eldoret & Other Stories. Published by Kwani?
2007 – What If I'm a Literary Gangster?, a poetry collection: Brown Bear Insignia

Literary Awards

References

External links 
 Burt Awards
 Sanaa Theatre Awards
 Miles Morland Foundation
 Standard Media Group Kenya

1975 births
Living people
Kenyan essayists
Kenyan novelists
Kenyan poets
Kenyan male writers
21st-century Kenyan writers
21st-century essayists
21st-century male writers
Writers from Nairobi
Kenyan columnists
Kenyan journalists